The 2014–15 Liga Națională was the 57th season of Romanian Handball League, the top-level men's professional handball league. The league comprises thirteen teams. CSM Oradea withdrew from Liga Națională. HCM Constanța were the defending champions, for the seventh time in a row.

Teams

League table

Play-Off

Knockout phase

League table – positions 1–4

League table – positions 5–8

Play-Out

Liga Națională (men's handball)
2015 in Romanian sport
2014 in Romanian sport
2014–15 domestic handball leagues